Brenda Marshall (born Ardis Ankerson; September 29, 1915 – July 30, 1992) was an American film actress.

Career
Marshall made her first film appearance as Ardis Gaines in Wives of Tomorrow (1937). Her initial billing as Brenda Marshall came in Espionage Agent (1939). The following year, she played the leading lady to Errol Flynn in The Sea Hawk. After divorcing actor Richard Gaines in 1940, she married William Holden in 1941, and her own career soon slowed. She starred opposite James Cagney in Captains of the Clouds (1942).

Marshall had a popular success in The Constant Nymph (1943), but she virtually retired after this, appearing in only four more films, including the Western Whispering Smith (1948). She also played scientist Nora Goodrich in the B picture cult film Strange Impersonation (1946). In 1955, five years after her last film role, she made an appearance as herself (billed as Mrs. William Holden) in the fourth-season episode of I Love Lucy titled "The Fashion Show".

Personal life

Marshall was born as Ardis Ankerson in the American Philippines to Swedish parents. She was one of two daughters of Otto Peter Ankerson, overseer of a large sugar plantation near Bacolod. Her mother died in 1925 when she was young, so Ardis, along with her older sister Ruth, attended grammar school and began high school studies as boarding students at the Brent School in Baguio. In the early 1930s, the girls were sent to San Antonio, Texas to complete high school. She attended Texas State College for Women in her freshman and sophomore years, 1933–1935, and was named the Freshman Class Beauty in 1934, chosen by modern dancer Ted Shawn.

Brenda Marshall was her stage name, but she refused to use the name off-camera and insisted that her friends call her by her real name. She married the actor Richard Huston Gaines in 1936, and they had one daughter, Virginia; the couple divorced in 1940.

In 1941, Marshall married actor William Holden, who adopted Virginia Gaines (born November 17, 1937, New York City). Marshall and Holden had two sons together, Peter Westfield "West" Holden (1943–2014) and Scott Porter Holden (1946–2005). After several separations, Marshall and Holden were divorced in 1971. Marshall moved to Palm Springs, California in 1971. She died in 1992 from throat cancer in Palm Springs, aged 76.

Filmography

References

Sources
 
 Gaines, Virginia Holden. Growing Up with William Holden: A Memoir (Strategems, 2007)

External links

 
 Photographs and literature
 Image of William Holden and Brenda Marshall, Academy Awards, Los Angeles, 1951. Los Angeles TimesPhotographic Archive (Collection 1429). UCLA Library Special Collections, Charles E. Young Research Library, University of California, Los Angeles.

1915 births
1992 deaths
20th-century American actresses
American film actresses
American people of Swedish descent
Actresses from San Antonio
Actresses from Palm Springs, California
Deaths from throat cancer
Deaths from cancer in California
Filipino emigrants to the United States